The 2000–01 Hampton Pirates men's basketball team represented Hampton University during the 2000–01 NCAA Division I men's basketball season. The Pirates were members of the Mid-Eastern Athletic Conference and were coached by Steve Merfeld, his fourth year as head coach. The Pirates played home games at the Hampton Convocation Center.

Hampton finished the season with a 25–7 record and an 14–4 MEAC record. The season was highlighted by the Pirates winning their first ever game in the NCAA Division I men's basketball tournament, becoming the fourth 15-seed to beat a 2-seed in the tournament. Hampton defeated Iowa State before losing to Georgetown in the second round.

Roster

Schedule and results 

|-
!colspan=9 style=| Regular season

|-
!colspan=9 style=| MEAC tournament

|-
!colspan=9 style=| NCAA tournament

|-

Awards and honors
Tarvis Williams – MEAC Player of the Year

References

External links 
 Hampton Basketball

Hampton Pirates men's basketball seasons
Hampton Pirates
Hampton Pirates men's basketball
Hampton Pirates men's basketball
Hampton